Harry Amos Bullis (7 October 1890 – 28 September 1963) was an American business executive who served as president and chairman of General Mills.

He joined the company as a mill hand in 1919, and he soon became the confidant of founder James Ford Bell. He helped expand their breakfast foods (Wheaties, Cheerios) and diversified into convenience foods (Betty Crocker cake mixes) and non-food businesses.

In 1948 Bullis married Countess Maria Smorczewska, a Polish refugee.

He died of Hodgkin's disease in Minneapolis, Minnesota.

References

External links
Papers of Harry A. Bullis, Dwight D. Eisenhower Presidential Library
Publicity photo of Bullis via Minnesota Historical Society

1890 births
1963 deaths
Chairmen of General Mills
20th-century American businesspeople